John Kenneth Albers (December 10, 1924 – April 19, 2007) was an American singer and brass musician who performed with The Four Freshmen from 1956 to 1982.

Albers was born in Woodbury, New Jersey. He served in the U.S. Army during World War II and attended the Philadelphia Conservatory of Music.

Albers sang with The Stuarts Quartet prior to joining The Four Freshmen in 1956. One of Albers' first appearances as a member of The Four Freshmen was a live telecast of The Ray Anthony Show in 1956.

In addition to being a vocalist, Albers played the trumpet, mellophone, and flugelhorn.

Albers died in Simi Valley, California in 2007, at the age of 82.

External links 
Ken Albers, 82; singer harmonized as one of the Four Freshmen. The Los Angeles Times. Retrieved April 21, 2007
The Four Freshmen discography on singers.com. Retrieved April 21, 2007

1924 births
2007 deaths
Flugelhorn players
People from Woodbury, New Jersey
American trumpeters
American male trumpeters
United States Army soldiers
United States Army personnel of World War II
University of the Arts (Philadelphia) alumni
20th-century American singers
20th-century trumpeters
The Four Freshmen members
20th-century American male singers